This is a list of episodes of the anime series Suzuka.   It follows the manga up to volume 9 chapter 72.

Episode list

Music

Notes

References

Episodes
Suzuka